Glavantsi is a village in Tervel Municipality, Dobrich Province in northeastern Bulgaria.

References

Villages in Dobrich Province